The 2004 Belarusian Premier League was the 14th season of top-tier football in Belarus. It started on April 15 and ended on November 11, 2004. Gomel were the defending champions.

Team changes from 2003 season
Two lowest placed teams in 2003 (Lokomotiv Minsk and Molodechno-2000) relegated and were replaced by two best teams from 2003 First League: newcomers MTZ-RIPO Minsk and Lokomotiv Vitebsk, who previously competed in Premiere League as KIM, Dvina and Lokomotiv-96 and is a different team from Lokomotiv Vitebsk, who relegated to First League in 1995 and after a few seasons in First and Second Leagues was disbanded in late 2000.

Overview
Dinamo Minsk won their 7th champions title and qualified for the next season's Champions League. The championship runners-up BATE Borisov and 2004–05 Cup winners MTZ-RIPO Minsk qualified for UEFA Cup. 2001 champions Belshina Bobruisk finished on last place and directly relegated to the First League. Lokomotiv Vitebsk and MTZ-RIPO Minsk shared 14th and 15th places with equal number of points and had to play one-legged play-off on a neutral ground to determine who will relegate and who will stay. Lokomotiv Vitebsk lost the game and relegated to the First League. Torpedo-SKA Minsk, who finished 6th, lost financial support from their sponsor in early 2005 and, after losing almost all their main squad and not having funds to pay entrance fee for next season's Premiere League, had to relegate to Second League.

Teams and venues

Table

Relegation play-off

Results

Belarusian clubs in European Cups

Top scorers

See also
2004 Belarusian First League
2003–04 Belarusian Cup
2004–05 Belarusian Cup

External links
RSSSF

Belarusian Premier League seasons
1
Belarus
Belarus